LeFlore is an unincorporated community located in Grenada County, Mississippi, United States and part of the Grenada Micropolitan Statistical Area .

The community was once home to three general stores, a hotel, and a cotton gin.

Leflore is located on the former Illinois Central Railroad.

A post office operated under the name Leflore from 1887 to 1978.

References

Unincorporated communities in Mississippi
Unincorporated communities in Grenada County, Mississippi